Sylhet Gas Fields Limited is a government owned major gas company in Bangladesh. It is under Petrobangla and is headquartered in  Haripur, Jaintapur, Sylhet District.

History
Sylhet Gas Fields Limited traces its origins to gas fields in  Haripur, Jaintapur Sylhet District discovered by Pakistan Petroleum in 1955. In 1960, the Sylhet gas fields starting producing gas to supply the Chhatak Cement Factory. On 8 May 1980, the Sylhet Gas Fields Limited was incorporated by the government of Bangladesh. On 23 December 1986, the company discovered the first oil field in Bangladesh at Well No. 7 in Haripur. The company is responsible for 5 gas fields in Sylhet division. On 1 August 2009, the company launched a condensate fractionation plant.

The company signed an agreement with PT Istana Karang Laut of Indonesia and Energypac Power Generation Ltd to further develop its condensate plant in August 2017. Sylhet Gas Fields limited is going to establish Catalytic reforming unit in Rashidpur area very soon. After completion this project this company will fulfil the total demand of Octane completely in Bangladesh.

References

Oil and gas companies of Bangladesh
Government-owned companies of Bangladesh
Organisations based in Sylhet
Sylhet Division
Economy of Sylhet
Natural gas fields in Bangladesh
Bangladeshi companies established in 1980
Energy companies established in 1980